The 2017 Central Connecticut Blue Devils football team represented Central Connecticut State University in the 2017 NCAA Division I FCS football season. The team was led by fourth-year head coach Pete Rossomando and played their home games at Arute Field. They were a member of the Northeast Conference. They finished the season 8–4, 6–0 in NEC play to win the conference title. They received the NEC's automatic bid to the FCS Playoffs, their first FCS playoff appearance in school history, where they were defeated by New Hampshire in the First Round.

Schedule

References

Central Connecticut
Central Connecticut Blue Devils football seasons
Northeast Conference football champion seasons
Central Connecticut
Central Connecticut Blue Devils football